La ciénaga is a 2001 internationally co-produced comedy-drama film written and directed by Lucrecia Martel in her feature directorial debut. The film stars an ensemble cast featuring Graciela Borges, Mercedes Morán, Martín Adjemián and Daniel Valenzuela.

The film is set in the high plains of northwestern Argentina and portrays the life of a self-pitying Argentine bourgeois family. It has received critical acclaim.

In 2022, it was selected as the greatest film of Argentine cinema in a poll organized by the specialized magazines La vida útil, Taipei and La tierra quema, which was presented at the Mar del Plata International Film Festival. Also in 2022, the film was included in Spanish magazine Fotogramass list of the 20 best Argentine films of all time.

Plot
Mecha, a woman in her 50s with several teenage children and a husband, Gregorio, wants to remain looking young. In order to avoid the hot and humid weather of the city, the family spends the summers in their decaying country estate named La Mandrágora. After Mecha falls and injures herself, she is confined to her bed, and takes to drinking. She resents her gloomy Amerindian servants, whom she accuses of theft and laziness. Mecha's cousin Tali, who lives in a modest house in town with her husband Rafael, makes repeated visits with her brood of young, noisy children to escape from her claustrophobic home. Before long, the crowded domestic situation in both homes strains the families' nerves, exposing repressed family mysteries and tensions that threaten to erupt into violence.

Cast
 Graciela Borges as Mecha
 Mercedes Morán as Tali
 Martín Adjemián as Gregorio
 Daniel Valenzuela as Rafael
 Leonora Balcarce as Verónica
 Silvia Baylé as Mercedes
 Sofia Bertolotto as Momi 
 Juan Cruz Bordeu as José 
 Noelia Bravo Herrera as Agustina
 Maria Micol Ellero as Mariana
 Andrea López as Isabel
 Sebastián Montagna as Luciano
 Franco Veneranda as Martín
 Fabio Villafane as Perro
 Diego Baenas as Joaquín

Background
Lucrecia Martel's screenplay for the film won the Sundance Institute/NHK Award in 1999; this award honors and supports emerging independent filmmakers. The jury suggested she re-write the script to follow a more traditional structure around one or two protagonists, but she chose instead to retain the script's diffuse nature.

Martel has said in media interviews that the story is based on "memories of her own family." She has also said, "I know what kind of film I've made. Not a very easy one! For me, it's not a realistic film. It's something strange, a little weird. It's the kind of film where you can't tell what's going to happen, and I wanted the audience to be very uncomfortable from the beginning."

Production
To find the child actors for the film, Martel held 2,400 auditions, 1,600 of which she recorded on video in a garage near her home in Salta, northwestern Argentina.

In casting the main characters Mecha and Tali, Martel says "in Salta I didn't find what I was looking for and, instead, I saw a television programme showed to me by a woman friend who knew what I was looking for. Graciela Borges was in it and I realized I had found my character. Mercedes Morán was more difficult because someone I had very much in mind inspired that character. Besides, the character Mercedes played in Gasoleros distracted me, due to the naturalistic language television has, which is the least natural in the world. But I saw her at some point in a magazine in some photographs they had taken of her with her daughter, on holiday, and there, away from the character in Gasoleros, I realized she was the only one for my film, as Lita Stantic had already suggested."

La ciénaga was shot entirely in Martel's hometown of Salta.

Distribution
La ciénaga was first featured at the Berlin International Film Festival on 8 February 2001. It opened in Argentina on 8 March at the Mar del Plata Film Festival, and received a wide release in Argentina on 12 April.

The film enjoyed a long film festival run, including the Karlovy Vary Film Festival; the Toronto International Film Festival; the Warsaw Film Festival; International Film Festival, Rotterdam; the Titanic International Filmpresence Festival, Hungary; the Adelaide International Film Festival; the Uruguay International Film Festival; and the Havana Film Festival, Cuba.

It was presented at the New York Film Festival on 2 October 2001, and opened in Los Angeles on 12 October.

The company Energia is the current sales agent for the film.

Critical reception
Review aggregator Rotten Tomatoes reports that 88% of critics gave the film a positive review, based on 43 reviews, with an average rating of 6.90/10. The site's consensus states: "Dense yet impressively focused, La Cienaga is a disquieting look at domestic dissatisfaction - and a powerful calling card for debuting writer-director Lucrecia Martel." On Metacritic, it has a 75 out of 100, based on 18 reviews, indicating "generally positive reviews".

Writing for The New York Times, critic Stephen Holden liked Lucrecia Martel's debut film, and called it "remarkable", writing, "The steamy ambiance in which the characters fester is a metaphor for creeping social decay...La ciénaga perspires from the screen, it creates a vision of social malaise that feels paradoxically familiar and new." Critic David Lipfert also liked the director's various sociological messages and metaphors. He believes the "New Argentina Cinema" is moving beyond the themes related to the military dictatorship period of the late 1970s and early 1980s. He wrote: "[Martel's] intense, in-your-face portrait of a dissolute middle class lacks the usual justifying criminal context. Martel simply holds up a mirror to Argentine society, and the result is devastating. Instead of creating an allegory with archetypes, she shows characters that are all too real. When still, her camera is low and close as though we were right on top of the actors."

When the film opened in New York City, Amy Taubin of The Village Voice wrote, "Lucrecia Martel's La ciénaga is a veritable Chekhov tragicomedy of provincial life. Making a brilliant debut, Martel constructs her narrative from quotidian incidents, myriad comings and goings, and a cacophony of voices competing for attention...[i]n a debut feature that's assured in every aspect, Martel's direction of the younger members of her cast is particularly notable."

According to review aggregator They Shoot Pictures, Don't They, it is the 76th most acclaimed film since 2000.

Awards
Wins
 Berlin International Film Festival: Alfred Bauer Prize, Lucrecia Martel; 2001.
 Havana Film Festival: Best Actress, Graciela Borges; Best Director, Lucrecia Martel; Best Sound, Hervé Guyader, Emmanuel Croset, Guido Berenblum, Adrián De Michele; Grand Coral - First Prize, Lucrecia Martel; 2001.
 Toulouse Latin America Film Festival: French Critics' Discovery Award, Lucrecia Martel; Grand Prix, Lucrecia Martel; 2001.
 Uruguay International Film Festival: First Work Award - Special Mention, Lucrecia Martel; 2001.  
 Uruguayan Film Critics Association: UFCA Award Best Latin American Film; 2001.
 Argentine Film Critics Association Awards: Silver Condor; Best Actress, Graciela Borges; Best Cinematography, Hugo Colace; Best First Film, Lucrecia Martel; 2002.

Nominations
 Berlin International Film Festival: Golden Berlin Bear, Lucrecia Martel; 2001.
 Argentine Film Critics Association Awards: Silver Condor; Best Art Direction, Graciela Oderigo; Best Director, Lucrecia Martel; Best Film; Best Original Screenplay, Lucrecia Martel; Best Supporting Actress, Mercedes Morán; 2002.
 MTV Movie Awards, Latin America: MTV Movie Award, MTV South Feed (mostly Argentina) - Favorite Film, Lucrecia Martel; 2002.

References

External links
 
 La ciénaga at cinenacional.com 
 La ciénaga review at Cineismo by Guillermo Ravaschino 
  
La Ciénaga: What's Outside the Frame an essay by David Oubiña at the Criterion Collection

2001 films
2001 drama films
Films about alcoholism
Films directed by Lucrecia Martel
Argentine independent films
2000s Spanish-language films
French independent films
Spanish independent films
Argentine drama films
French drama films
Spanish drama films
2001 independent films
2000s French films
2000s Argentine films